The 2011 Turning Point was a professional wrestling pay-per-view event produced by Total Nonstop Action Wrestling (TNA) promotion, that took place on November 13, 2011 at the Impact Wrestling Zone in Orlando, Florida. It was the eighth event under the Turning Point chronology.

In October 2017, with the launch of the Global Wrestling Network, the event became available to stream on demand.

Storylines

Turning Point featured eleven professional wrestling matches that involved different wrestlers from pre-existing scripted feuds and storylines. Wrestlers portrayed villains, heroes, or less distinguishable characters in the scripted events that built tension and culminated in a wrestling match or series of matches.

Results

References

External links
Official Turning Point website
Impact Wrestling.com

Impact Wrestling Turning Point
2011 in professional wrestling in Florida
Events in Orlando, Florida
Professional wrestling in Orlando, Florida
November 2011 events in the United States
2011 Total Nonstop Action Wrestling pay-per-view events